Shchuchinsk (Şuchinsk;) is a city in northern-central Kazakhstan, located 75 kilometres south-east of Kokshetau on Lake Shchuchye. It is the seat of Burabay District (form. Shchuchinsk District) in Akmola Region and is the centre of a large agricultural area.

Geography 
Shchuchinsk is located at the feet of the Kokshetau Massif, in the Kokshetau Hills, northern part of the Kazakh Uplands. Burabay spa town lies nearby to the northeast.

History
Shchuchinsk was founded as a Cossack settlement called Shchuchye (посёлок Щучье) in 1850.

Sport
National Ski Center with two modern olympic ski jumping hills, large (K125) and normal (K90), 16 FIS cross-country ski courses and biathlon stadium has opened in July 2018.

Vladimir Smirnov, cross-country skier, Olympic champion 1994 was born in Shchuchinsk.

Nikolay Chebotko, cross-country skier, bronze medalist World Ski Championship 2013 was born in Shchuchinsk.

Svetlana Kapanina, world women's aerobatic champion, most celebrated woman pilot in history was born in Shchuchinsk.

Sister Cities
 Jermuk, Armenia

References

Populated places in Akmola Region